Cameron Smith (born 24 August 1995) is a Scottish footballer who plays as a forward for Partick Thistle in the Scottish Championship. He began his career with Aberdeen, and initially played for Dundee United on loan in 2016 before joining St Mirren. He rejoined Dundee United permanently in 2019, and was on loan to Irish club Dundalk in 2020. After brief stints with Ayr United and Indy Eleven, Smith joined Partick Thistle in July 2021. Smith has represented Scotland at various levels up to under-21 international.

Career

Aberdeen
Smith was raised in the village of Balmedie in Aberdeenshire, where he was a neighbour of fellow footballer Scott Wright, and attended Bridge of Don Academy. He came through Aberdeen's youth system, and was considered to be one of their brightest prospects. Manager Craig Brown wanted to give Smith his debut at the start of the 2011–12 season; however, Smith was under 16 and Scottish Premier League rules prevented him from playing. He eventually made his debut on 21 April 2012, coming on as a 54th-minute substitute against Inverness Caledonian Thistle.

Smith's first game of the 2012–13 season came as a substitute at Pittodrie against St Mirren, in which he hit the crossbar with a header. He went on to score his first senior goal with a header in a 1–1 draw at Inverness Caledonian Thistle. Smith came on as an early substitute in Aberdeen's win in the League Cup Final over the same opposition but was himself substituted later in the game. In the 2014–15 season, Smith made several substitute appearances and scored in a 2–0 win against St Johnstone, at the time sending the Dons to the top of the table.

In July 2016, Smith joined Scottish Championship side Dundee United on loan where he scored five goals in 23 appearances. His loan with United was cut short on 26 January 2017.

St Mirren
After leaving Dundee United, Smith was loaned to fellow Championship side St Mirren for the remainder of the season. After his loan deal ended, Smith signed a two-year contract to join St Mirren on a permanent transfer on 22 May 2017. He was St Mirren's player of the year in 2018 as they won the Championship title and were promoted.

Dundee United
Smith rejoined Dundee United on a permanent basis in January 2019, for an undisclosed transfer fee.

On 3 February 2020, it was announced that Smith had joined League of Ireland Premier Division Champions Dundalk on loan, following a successful trial period. He returned to Dundee United in June 2020, following the shutdown of football caused by the COVID-19 pandemic. Smith was loaned to Ayr United in October 2020.

On 20 January 2021, it was announced that Smith had left Dundee Utd., following the expiration of his contract.

Ayr United
After leaving Dundee United, Smith signed a short-term contract with Ayr United.

Indy Eleven
On 1 April 2021, Smith joined USL Championship side Indy Eleven.

Partick Thistle
Smith returned to Scotland in July 2021 and signed a two-year contract with Partick Thistle.

Style of play
Smith is primarily a forward but can also play in midfield. His Aberdeen manager Craig Brown said that he was, "a strong, gifted striker." and said that he played like Dennis Bergkamp but was built like Joe Harper.

Career statistics

Honours
Aberdeen
 Scottish League Cup: 2013–14

St Mirren
 Scottish Championship: 2017–18

References

1995 births
Living people
Scottish footballers
Footballers from Aberdeenshire
People educated at Bridge of Don Academy
Scotland youth international footballers
Association football forwards
Aberdeen F.C. players
Dundee United F.C. players
Scottish Premier League players
Scottish Professional Football League players
Scotland under-21 international footballers
St Mirren F.C. players
People from Formartine
Dundalk F.C. players
League of Ireland players
Ayr United F.C. players
Indy Eleven players
Scottish expatriate sportspeople in the United States
Scottish expatriate footballers
Expatriate soccer players in the United States
Partick Thistle F.C. players